The Southern Cordilleran languages are a group of closely related languages within the Northern Luzon subgroup of the Austronesian language family. They are spoken in an area stretching from the southern shore of Lingayen Gulf to the highlands of Quirino province. The most widely spoken Southern Cordilleran language is Pangasinan, one of the eight major languages of the Philippines.

Internal classification 
The subgroup was first proposed by Zorc (1979). Himes (1998) classifies the Southern Cordilleran languages as follows:
Ilongot
West Southern Cordilleran
Pangasinan
Nuclear Southern Cordilleran
Ibaloi (including Iwak)
Karao
Kalanguya

Reconstruction 

Proto-Southern Cordilleran has been reconstructed by Himes (1998).

Phonology

Vocabulary 
The comparison table (taken from Himes (1998) and Zorc (1979)) illustrates the correspondences between the Southern Cordilleran languages, including inherited vocabulary as well as Southern Cordilleran innovations.

References

External links 
"Southern Cordilleran" at Ethnologue, 23rd ed., 2020.

Northern Luzon languages
South–Central Cordilleran languages